Sacrae Domus Militiae Templi Hierosolymitani magistri : Untersuchungen z. Geschichte d. Templerordens 1118/19-1314 is a work of scholarship by the German author Marie Luise Bulst-Thiele.  Published in 1974, the 416-page book covers the medieval order of the Knights Templar and is often cited by other medieval historians.

It has been cited with the abbreviations of B-T and M. Sacrae domus.

References
 
 Alain Demurger, The Last Templar, p. 223
 Sylvia Schein, "Gesta Dei per Mongolos", 1979, English Historical Review

1974 non-fiction books
Medieval studies literature
Knights Templar